The 1987–88 season was Celtic's 99th season of competitive football, and also marked the club's centenary. Davie Hay was dismissed as manager in the close season following the team's failure to win any trophies during season 1986–87. Billy McNeill returned as manager, following four years in England with Manchester City and Aston Villa.

The playing squad saw a large turnaround in the summer of 1987, with Brian McClair, Mo Johnston, Murdo MacLeod and Alan McInally all leaving. Danny McGrain was given a free transfer and Davie Provan retired due to ill health. Centre-half Mick McCarthy was signed by Davie Hay a few days prior to his sacking. Billy McNeill then went on to sign Motherwell striker Andy Walker, Sheffield Wednesday full-back Chris Morris and Aberdeen midfielder Billy Stark over the summer. As the season progressed, forwards Frank McAvennie and Joe Miller were also signed.

Celtic made a strong start to their league campaign, and went on to win their 34th league championship title. During the autumn, Celtic were knocked out of the UEFA Cup by Borussia Dortmund and the Scottish League Cup by Aberdeen. Celtic reached the Scottish Cup Final having come from behind against Hearts in the semi-final, scoring twice in the final four minutes to win 2–1. Celtic again went a goal down in the final against Dundee United, but came back to win, Frank McAvennie scoring the winning goal in the last minute to clinch a league and cup double.

Competitions

Scottish Premier Division

League table

Matches

Scottish Cup

Scottish League Cup

UEFA Cup

Glasgow Cup

Squad statistics

Transfers

Transfers In 

Total spend: £2.575 million

Transfers Out 

Total received: £1.785 million

See also
 List of Celtic F.C. seasons

References

Celtic F.C. seasons
Celtic
Scottish football championship-winning seasons